John Boles Watson (c. 1748 – 1813 Cheltenham) built the first permanent theatre in Cheltenham at York Passage, 1782. Boles Watson also built the Theatre Royal, Gloucester, in 1791 and was closely associated with the Cirencester theatre.

References

External links
'The Watsons of Kilconnor, County Carlow, 1650 - Present', 2019 by Peter Coutts and Alan Watson

Further reading
Denning, Anthony. (1993) Theatre in the Cotswolds: The Boles Watson Family and the Cirencester Theatre. London: Society for Theatre Research. 

1740s births
1813 deaths
English theatre managers and producers